The Elizabethtown Tract was a property that was purchased on October 28, 1664, by John Baily, Daniel Denton and Luke Watson from the Native Americans that is in the area of (and surrounding) present-day Elizabeth, New Jersey. The Native American witnesses to the treaty gave their names as Warinanco and Mattano.
As specified in the Deed, the purchase included the area "Bounded on the South by a River commonly called the Raritons River, and on the East by the River which Parts Staten-Island and the Main, and to run Northward up after Cull-Bay, till we come at the first River which sets Westwards up after Cull-Bay." The territory encompassed lands from the mouth of the Raritan River and included all of present-day Union County as well as parts of Somerset, Middlesex, Morris and Essex counties.

Shortly after the purchase, Denton explored the area in and surrounding his purchase. In 1670, Denton wrote the first English-language description of the area.

See also
Province of East Jersey
Province of New Jersey
Colonial history of New Jersey

References

External links
Indian Deed for the Elizabethtown Tract

Pre-statehood history of New Jersey
Geography of Elizabeth, New Jersey
Union County, New Jersey
History of Elizabeth, New Jersey
1664 establishments in New Jersey